L'Université Nantes Angers Le Mans is a consortium of universities, graduate schools, as well as teaching hospitals and research institutes from the Pays de la Loire region in France.

Founding members 
 University of Nantes 
 University of Angers
 University of Maine
 Ecole Centrale de Nantes
 Ecole des Mines de Nantes
 Agrocampus Ouest
 Oniris
 Nantes University Hospital
 Angers University Hospital
 ESA group
 Audencia Nantes

Associate members 
 CNAM
 Arts et Métiers - Angers
 ENSA Nantes
 Ecole de design Nantes Atlantique
 ESBA Nantes Métropole
 ESBA TALM
 ENSM
 ESSCA
 ESEO group
 ESB group
 ICAM
 Ismans
 Integrated Center for Oncology
 Ifremer
 Ifsttar
 Inserm
 Université Catholique de l'Ouest

University associations and consortia in France
Education in Pays de la Loire